So What (Chinese: 那又怎样, Pinyin: Nà yòu zěnyàng) is a song recorded and composed by Chinese singer-songwriter Xu Weizhou. It is the second single released from Xu's album "The Time".

Background and release
So What is a pop song with a length of three minutes and fifty-five seconds. It was composed by Xu Weizhou himself and the lyrics were written by Zhang Chang.  It is included in 1st quarter of "The Time". The whole quarter was officially released on 10 August 2017 while the official music video was released on 11 September at several Chinese streaming sites as well as YouTube. Its music video was shot in London. 

Xu performed the song live for the first time during the iQiyi Screaming Night Concert on 19 August 2017.

Credits and personnel
Credits were adapted from the official music video. 
Star Power (Beijing) Culture Media Co., Ltd and Timmy Xu Studio – presentation, production
Baina Entertainment – digital distribution
Lee Shih Shiong – producer
Xu Weizhou – composer, lead vocals
Zhang Chang – lyricist
Derek Chua – music arrangement
Li Hao – executive producer
Felix Cooper – director
Li Bo – editor
Wang Gang – colorist
David Tan – backing vocals, backing vocals arrangement
Liao Zhengxing – A&R
Rachel Xie – line producer
Zhou Caoyuan, Li Chen Chen – dubbing assistant
Zhangjin – make-up
Li Kunmo – stylist

Chart performance

Weekly

References

2017 songs
2017 singles